Alan Walter Hime (1929–1985), was a male swimmer who competed for England.

Swimming career
He represented England and won a bronze medal in the 220 yards breaststroke at the 1954 British Empire and Commonwealth Games in Vancouver, Canada.

After he retired from competitive swimming he became a Great Britain swimming team manager.

References

1929 births
1985 deaths
English male swimmers
Commonwealth Games medallists in swimming
Commonwealth Games bronze medallists for England
Swimmers at the 1954 British Empire and Commonwealth Games
Medallists at the 1954 British Empire and Commonwealth Games